Charles Foote may refer to:

 Charles A. Foote (1785–1828), United States Representative from New York
 Charles C. Foote (1811–1891), American Presbyterian minister, abolitionist and temperance activist